Lê Hoàng (born 20 January 1956 in Hanoi) is a Vietnamese film director and screenwriter.

In 1998, he directed the film Ai xuôi vạn lý, which he won several awards for including at the Rotterdam International Film Festival.

His 2000 film Chiec chia khoa vang, was a romantic war film.

Filmography
 1995 Lưỡi dao Le Couteau
 1998 Ai xuôi vạn lý 
 2000 Chiếc chìa khóa vàng
 2003 Gái nhảy

References

Vietnamese film directors
1956 births
Living people
Vietnamese screenwriters